Vladislav Sergeyevich Grinev (born 21 July 1996) is a Russian swimmer. He competed in the men's 4 × 100 metre freestyle relay event at the 2018 European Aquatics Championships, winning the gold medal. Grinev broke the national record in 100 m freestyle, which lasted 10 years, on 9 April 2019. He swam 47.43, improving the previous result of Andrey Grechin.

References

External links
 

1996 births
Living people
Russian male swimmers
Russian male freestyle swimmers
European Aquatics Championships medalists in swimming
World Aquatics Championships medalists in swimming
Swimmers from Moscow
Swimmers at the 2020 Summer Olympics
Olympic swimmers of Russia
Medalists at the FINA World Swimming Championships (25 m)
20th-century Russian people
21st-century Russian people